Lachnellula is a genus of fungi in the family Lachnaceae. The genus contains 40 species. Lachnellula was circumscribed in 1884 by Petter Karsten, with Lachnellula chrysophthalma assigned as the type species.

Many species are associated with canker disease on various conifers, including Lachnellula willkommii, which causes the feared disease of larch canker to some larch trees.

Species

Lachnellula abietis 
Lachnellula aeruginosa 
Lachnellula agassizii 
Lachnellula angustispora 
Lachnellula arida 
Lachnellula bruneiensis 
Lachnellula calva 
Lachnellula calyciformis 
Lachnellula calycina 
Lachnellula cervina 
Lachnellula chrysophthalma 
Lachnellula ciliata 
Lachnellula cyphelloides 
Lachnellula dabaensis 
Lachnellula ellisiana 
Lachnellula eucalypti 
Lachnellula flavovirens 
Lachnellula fuckelii 
Lachnellula fuscosanguinea 
Lachnellula himalayensis 
Lachnellula hyalina 
Lachnellula ikenoi 
Lachnellula intricata 
Lachnellula juniperina 
Lachnellula kamtschatica 
Lachnellula laricis 
Lachnellula minuscula 
Lachnellula minuta 
Lachnellula occidentalis 
Lachnellula pittospori 
Lachnellula populina 
Lachnellula pseudofarinacea 
Lachnellula pseudotsugae 
Lachnellula pulverulenta 
Lachnellula rattanicola 
Lachnellula rehmii 
Lachnellula resinaria 
Lachnellula rhopalostylidis 
Lachnellula robusta Baral 
Lachnellula schumannii 
Lachnellula splendens 
Lachnellula subtilissima 
Lachnellula succina 
Lachnellula suecica 
Lachnellula tuberculata 
Lachnellula viridiglauca 
Lachnellula willkommii

References

Helotiales
Leotiomycetes genera
Taxa named by Petter Adolf Karsten
Taxa described in 1884